The 2006 Volta a la Comunitat Valenciana was the 64th edition of the Volta a la Comunitat Valenciana road cycling stage race, which was held from 21 February to 25 February 2006. The race started in Calpe and finished in Valencia. The race was won by Antonio Colom of the  team.

General classification

References

Volta a la Comunitat Valenciana
2006 in road cycling
2006 in Spanish sport